Arhopala araxes is a butterfly in the family Lycaenidae. It was described by Cajetan Felder and Rudolf Felder in 1865. It is found in the Indomalayan realm.

Subspecies
A. a. araxes Sulawesi, Sula, Sanghie
A. a. onetor  Fruhstorfer, 1914 Sumatra, Java, Sumbawa, Sumba, Savu, Timor, Kissar, Wetar, Leti
A. a. talauta  (Evans, 1957)  Talaut Group
A. a. verelius  Fruhstorfer, 1914

References

External links
Arhopala Boisduval, 1832 at Markku Savela's Lepidoptera and Some Other Life Forms. Retrieved June 3, 2017.

Arhopala
Butterflies described in 1863